Anny Schlemm (born February 22, 1929 in Neu-Isenburg) is a German operatic soprano and later mezzo-soprano.

Her father, Friedrich Schlemm, was a chorister at the Oper Frankfurt. Schlemm studied in Berlin with Erna Westenberger and made her debut 1946 at the Halle Opera House in Halle an der Saale as Nanette in Lortzing's Der Wildschütz. In 1949 she joined the Komische Oper Berlin, where she remained until 1961 and is a lifelong Member of Honour. During that period her roles included Susanna, Marenka, Donna Elvira, Desdemona, Manon Lescaut, Octavian, Arabella among others. She also sang at the opera houses of Cologne, Hamburg, Dresden, Frankfurt, Stuttgart, Munich, and at the Bayreuth Festival and more.

Schlemm made guest appearances at the Vienna State Opera, the Royal Opera House in London, the Glyndebourne Festival, the Paris Opéra, the Holland Festival and more.

Later, as her voice darkened, she became a famous exponent of roles such as Clytemnestra in Elektra, Herodias in Salome, Kabanicha in Káťa Kabanová, and Kostelnicka in Jenůfa.

A superb singing-actress and highly versatile artist, Schlemm was equally at home in comic and dramatic roles. She was married to conductor Wolfgang Rennert.

Sources
 annyschlemm.de
 Operissimo.com

1929 births
German operatic sopranos
German operatic mezzo-sopranos
Living people